The 2019–20 LPB season was the 87th season of the premier Portuguese basketball league and the 12th season under the current Liga Portuguesa de Basquetebol (LPB) format. For sponsorship reasons, the league was also known as Liga Placard.

On 29 April 2020, the FPB declared the season was void because of the COVID-19 pandemic. No champion was named and there was no relegation.

Format
Fourteen teams played a double-legged regular season. The eight first teams joined the playoffs while teams 9 to 12 played for avoiding relegation. The loser of this second playoff was relegated with the two last qualified teams.

Teams

Barreirense Optimize and Maia promoted from Proliga and replaced Imortal, last qualified team in the last season.

Sporting CP, refounded 24 years later, joined directly the top tier after the unanimous approval of the league clubs.

Regular season

League table

Results

Portuguese clubs in European competitions

References

External links
FPB website 

Liga Portuguesa de Basquetebol seasons
Portuguese
LPB